Zenodochium sostra is a moth in the family Blastobasidae. It is found on the Canary Islands.

The wingspan is about 10 mm. The forewings are white with a faint shade of pale greyish fuscous dusting. The hindwings are shining white.

References

Moths described in 1910
Blastobasidae